Cardross railway station is a railway station serving the village of Cardross, Scotland. It is on the North Clyde Line between Dalreoch and Craigendoran, positioned on the banks of the north side of the River Clyde. The station is managed by ScotRail, who operate all services.

History 
The station was opened by the Glasgow, Dumbarton and Helensburgh Railway on 28 May 1858. The line was electrified in 1960. There were some goods sidings here previously - possibly built in the late 1940s - but these were removed in the mid-1960s with the end of regular freight movements on the line.

Facilities 

The station is well equipped with shelters, help points and benches on both platforms, as well as a ticket office on bike racks on platform 1, with a car park adjacent. Both platforms have step-free access, and are linked by both a footbridge and a level crossing. Platform 1 unusually has five different points of access, plus others from platform 2, via the footbridge.

Passenger volume 

The statistics cover twelve month periods that start in April.

Services 
On weekdays & Saturdays, there is a typically half-hourly service westbound to Helensburgh Central, and eastbound to Edinburgh Waverley, via Glasgow Queen Street low-level and Airdrie, which skips stations between Dalmuir and Hyndland. On Sundays, the service remains half-hourly, but trains serve all stations via . Trains operating to the West Highland Line do not stop here, except for one departure in the morning, which runs to Glasgow Queen Street via Maryhill.

References

Bibliography

External links

Video footage of Cardross railway station

Railway stations in Argyll and Bute
Former North British Railway stations
Railway stations in Great Britain opened in 1858
SPT railway stations
Railway stations served by ScotRail
Listed railway stations in Scotland
Category C listed buildings in Argyll and Bute